Tsoukalades is a village of the Livadeia municipality. The 2011 census recorded 121 residents in the village. Tsoukalades is a part of the community of Livadeia.

Population
According to the 2011 census, the population of Tsoukalades was 121 people, a decrease of almost 16% compared to that of the previous census of 2001.

See also
 List of settlements in Boeotia

References

Populated places in Boeotia
Villages in Greece